United Service Institution of India (USI) is a national security and defence services think tank based in New Delhi, India. It describes its aim as the "furtherance of interest and knowledge in the art, science and literature of the defence services".

USI operates centres for research in various areas of national security. The USI Journal, published quarterly since 1872, is the oldest defence journal in Asia. It also publishes a number of monographs based on research and study by its members.

History
The United Service Institution was established in 1870 by Major General Sir Charles MacGregor in Shimla. It was founded as a society in the furtherance of interest and knowledge in the art, science and literature of the Defence Services. The institute was initially housed in the Old Town Hall, and later received temporary accommodation in the Indian Army Headquarters, which was also then based in Shimla.

In 1908, the institute acquired its own premises near Combermere Post Office in Shimla Hills. Among the distinguished officers who have served as its secretary, was Field Marshal William Joseph Slim in the 1930s.

After independence and the subsequent partition of India, the institute attempted to continue as a joint institution for both countries as the United Service Institution of India and Pakistan. The four 1948 issues of the institute's journal were published jointly. However, following the Indo-Pakistani War of 1947, cross-border relations were interrupted and the institute has since been known as the United Service Institution of India.

Following independence, the institute went through financially testing times. It had to sell its Shimla headquarters. In 1953, the institute relocated to New Delhi. The institute survived primarily due to the efforts of Colonel (Retd.) Pyara Lal, its secretary from 1957 to 1987. The institute operated in New Delhi from Kashmir House until 1996. The foundation stone for its current headquarters in Vasant Vihar, New Delhi, was laid on 26 April 1993, and the institute was relocated in 1996.

Activities
USI operates two centres of research and one centre for coaching predominantly Indian Army and limited Indian Naval officers for Professional Military Education exams.

Centre for Strategic Studies and Simulation
The Centre for Strategic Studies and Simulation (CS3) is focused on conducting research and analyses on national and international security issues. It leverages gaming and simulation of strategic scenarios, to explore options for wider discussion and consideration.

Centre for Armed Forces Historical Research
The Centre for Armed Forces Historical Research (CAFHR) studies the history of Indian Armed Forces. It focuses on diverse aspects of the services policies and practices—strategic, tactical, logistical, organisational, socio-economic. CAFHR is organized into four research groups focusing on different periods of Indian history—that before 1750, from 1750 to 1900, 1900 to 1947 and post-1947. The centre also does consulting, script writing and guidance for movies and documentaries related to Military History.

Courses Section (Coaching for Professional Military Education)

Colonel Pyara Lal Memorial Library

Colonel Pyara Lal Memorial Library (Information Resource Centre) of USI is a knowledge hub in the area of Defence Studies/Services, Strategic Perspective, War/Warfare, Conflict/Peace Studies/United Nation, Foreign/International Relations/Diplomacy, Continent /Countries studies, National/ International Security, Insurgency/Naxalism/Terrorism, Nuclear Issues, General/ Academic/ Historical Studies and Autobiography/Biography/Memoires/ Travelite. It is a highly specialised library for enhancing and enriching knowledge while concurrently facilitating education, research, training, self-development, well-being, and lifelong learning. A full spectrum of ever-expanding body of worldwide knowledge and information superiority is maintained by acquiring, and furthering ease of access to books, manuscripts, and other print and non-print materials and preserving these for the benefit of the members.

Keeping in view the convenience of its patrons, the library is located on the ground floor of United Service Institution of India, New Delhi and is air-conditioned.

The library has computerised its activities, processes, products and services for the benefit of users to facilitate fast access to the information held in the library and to promote the evolution of library use, and increasing availability of library resources to its members.

Publications

Some of the famous books and monographs published by the institution are:
 A Talent for War: The Military Biography of Lt Gen Sagat Singh (2013), Maj Gen Randhir Sinh (Retd), Vij Books India / United Service Institution of India, . A military biography of Lt Gen Sagat Singh.
 China and India: A Comparative Analysis of Approaches to Energy Security by Prashant Agrawal
 China's Asia-Pacific Strategy and India by Narendra Kumar Tripathi
 China's Maritime Ambitions and the PLA Navy by Sandeep Dewan (foreword by Srikant Kondapalli)
 China's Quest for Global Dominance:Reality or Myth by Ed PJS Sandhu (Retd)
 Coastal Security- Maritime Dimensions of India's Homeland Security by Prof K R Singh
 Countering Insurgencies in India — An Insiders View by E M Rammohan, IPS (Retd)
 Countering Transnational Terrorism by Brig Rahul K Bhonsle(Retd)
 Counterinsurgency and Quest for Peace by Col Anil Athale (Retd)
 Echoes from Beyond the Banihal-Kashmir : Human Rights and Armed Forces by Sujata Kanungo
 India Bangladesh Relations: The Way Ahead by Lt Gen Y M Bammi(Retd)
 Iran's Relations with Pakistan: A Strategic Analysis by Dr. Satyanarayan Pattanayak
 Left Wing Extremism: Assessment and Counter Insurgency Strategy by Col Akshaya Handa
 Maoist Insurgency and India's Internal Security by EN Rammohan, Amrit Pal Singh, AK Agarwal
 Minerals, Market and Maritime Strategy by Cmde Sujeet Samaddar
 Multi-Vector Policies of Central Asian Nations and India by Brig Vinod Anand (Retd)
 National Security Challenges for India in the Next Decade — Conflicts in North East
 Pak Af Equation and Future of Afghanistan by Brig Vinod Ana nd (Retd)
 Peace and Stability in Afghanistan: The Way Ahead by Ed: Maj Gen Y K Gera (Retd)
 Peace and Stability in Asia-Pacific Region — Assessment of the Security Architecture Architecture by Maj Gen Y K Gera
 Possibility of a Nuclear War in Asia- An Indian Perspective by Col G G Pamidi
 Reorganising the Air Force for Future Operations by AVM A K Tiwary, VSM
 Rising China: Opportunity or Strategic Challenge by Maj Gen P J S Sandhu (Retd)
 Strategies for Countering Non State Actors in South Asia by Ed Maj Gen PJS Sandhu
 Stress, Suicide and Fratricides in the Armyby Maj Gen Samay Ram (Retd)
 Suicide Terrorism: Relevance in Indian Context by Lt Col Behram A Sahukar
 The Implacable Taliban, Repeating History in Afghanistan by E N Rammohan
 The Indian Armed Forces: Socio Legal Perspective by Wg Cdr U C Jha (Retd)
 The Invisible Wall of China by Mohit Nayal
 Transformation of the Indian Armed Forces 2025- Enhancing India's Defence by Maj Gen A K Lal (retd)
 Water Issues in Sino- Indian & Indo — Pak Relations by Narender Kumar Tripathi

See also
MacGregor Medal
Centre for Land Warfare Studies
Centre for Air Power Studies (India)
Democracy in India
Election Commission of India
Institute for Defence Studies and Analyses
List of think tanks in India

References

Think tanks based in India
Organisations based in Delhi
Foreign policy and strategy think tanks in India
Organizations established in 1870
1870 establishments in India
Military history of India